Protected areas of Qatar include:

 Al Reem Biosphere Preserve (designated in 2007) is part of the World Network of Biosphere Reserves in the Arab States
 Al Shahaniyah Park in Al-Shahaniya
 Al Thakira Nature Reserve in Al Thakhira
 Al Wabra Wildlife Preservation 
 Dahl Al Hammam Park, a sinkhole in Doha (entrance to the hole is now closed to the public)	
 Khor Al Adaid Natural Reserve in Khor Al Adaid 
 Khor Al Udeid Fish Sanctuary	
Mudhlem Cave in Mukaynis
Musfer Sinkhole in Salwa 
 Ras Abrouq Nature Reserve (also known as Bir Zekreet (Zekreet Beach)) in Ras Abrouq
 Ras Ushairij Gazelle Conservation Park	
 Umm Tais National Park

References

External links
World Database on Protected Areas

 
Qatar
Qatar geography-related lists